This is a list of estimates of the real gross domestic product  growth rate (not rebased GDP) in Oceanian states for the latest years recorded in the CIA World Factbook. States are not included if their latest growth estimate was for a year prior to 2014. The list contains some non-sovereign territories.

List

See also
 Economic growth
 GDP

References

Growth, Oceania

Countries by GDP growth
Lists of countries in Oceania